University of Algiers Abou El Kacem Saadallah, commonly called the Algiers 2 University, is an Algerian public university located in Bouzareah (Algiers Province) in the north of the country.

Created in 2009 after the division of the University of Algiers to three universities (University of Algiers 1, University of Algiers 2 and University of Algiers 3).

See also 
 List of universities in Algeria

References

External links
 Official website
 University of Algiers
 University of Algiers 3

2009 establishments in Algeria
Algiers
Buildings and structures in Algiers